Arogya Niketan is a 1953 Indian Bengali novel written by Tarasankar Bandyopadhyay. In 1955 for this novel, Bandyopadhyay received  Rabindra Puraskar and in 1956 he received Sahitya Akademi Award (Bengali). In 1967, this novel was picturised by director Bijoy Bose as Arogya Niketan.

The novel was translated into Gujarati by Ramnik Meghani.

See also 
 List of Sahitya Akademi Award winners for Bengali

References 

1953 novels
Bengali-language novels
Sahitya Akademi Award-winning works